This Is My Time may refer to:
 This Is My Time (Raven-Symoné album), 2004
 This Is My Time (The Dogg album), 2009
 "This Is My Time" (song), a 2000 song by Sasha
 "This Is My Time", a song by 3 Colours Red, from the album Revolt
 "This Is My Time", by Lecrae from the soundtrack of the 2020 video game Spider-Man: Miles Morales